Pierre Cartier may refer to:

 Pierre C. Cartier (1878–1964), French jeweler
 Pierre Cartier (mathematician) (born 1932)